Haplochromis granti is a species of cichlid endemic to Lake Victoria, though it may now be extinct.  This species can reach a length of  SL. The specific name honours the Scottish naturalist and explorer James Augustus Grant (1827-1892) who was the co-discoverer of Lake Victoria's role as a major source of the Nile, alongside John Henning Speke.

References

granti
Freshwater fish of Kenya
Fish of Lake Victoria
Fish described in 1906
Taxonomy articles created by Polbot